Jugtown may refer to a location in the United States:

 Gardendale, Alabama, formerly known as Jugtown
 Jugtown, Maryland, a census-designated place
 Jugtown, Pennsylvania, a census-designated place
 Jugtown Historic District, Princeton, New Jersey
 Jugtown Pottery in Seagrove, North Carolina, a location listed on the National Register of Historic Places
 Sterrett, Alabama, also known as Jugtown